Halvor Langdon Halvorson (July 15, 1881 – October 3, 1951) was an American politician and attorney who served as the mayor of Minot, North Dakota and later became a perennial candidate in North Dakota's congressional elections.

Early life

On August 15, 1881, Halvor Langdon Halvorson was born in Henning, Minnesota. In 1902, he graduated from the University of North Dakota with a law degree and in 1908, moved to Minot, North Dakota.

Career

In 1910, he ran for state treasurer against incumbent Republican Gunder Olson and in September was named as vice chairman of the state Democratic party, but was defeated. Following the resignation of former Commission President Arthur LeSueur on May 17, 1911, a special election was held on June 6, in which Halvorson narrowly defeated Dorr H. Carroll and Peter Vandenoever with 232 votes against 196 and 94 votes. In 1912, 1914, and 1918, Halvorson ran for North Dakota's third House district, but lost each time with his best showing being 31.16%. He served as a delegate to the 1916 Democratic National Convention and gave his support to incumbent President Woodrow Wilson.

In 1916, Halvorson attempted to win the Democratic nomination for governor, but was defeated by D. H. McArthur who went on to lose in a landslide to Lynn Frazier. In 1924, he narrowly defeated L. S. Platon for the Democratic gubernatorial nomination with 6,020 votes to 5,244 votes and was narrowly defeated by Arthur G. Sorlie with 53.93% to 46.07% of the vote.

In 1932 and 1938, he attempted to win the Democratic nomination for Senator, but was defeated both times. In 1940, he won the Democratic nomination for attorney general and was narrowly defeated by incumbent Alvin C. Strutz with 52.19% to 47.81% of the vote. In 1942 and 1944, he ran for North Dakota's at-large congressional district, but was defeated both times although he was the best performing Democrat both times.

In 1949, he was one of the attorneys who advised the Turtle Mountain Band of Chippewa Indians in their $24,000,000 claim against the federal government. On October 3, 1951, he died in a Minot hospital after being there since June 26 due to pneumonia and a heart condition.

Electoral history

References

|-

1881 births
1951 deaths
People from Otter Tail County, Minnesota
University of North Dakota alumni
Mayors of Minot, North Dakota
North Dakota lawyers
North Dakota Democrats
20th-century American politicians
20th-century American lawyers